Music Makers is a programme for seven to nine years old which offered a stimulating mixture of animation, documentary and graphics to illustrate basic techniques for composing.

Narrator
Bernard Cribbins

Actors
David Antrobus 
Max Cane 
Kwame Kwei-Armah 
Caroline O'Connor 
Suzanne Packer 
Issy Van Randwyck

Producers
Andrea Christodoulou 
Julie Callanan

Directors
Mark Alexander Holness 
Julie Callanan

References

1994 British television series debuts
2007 British television series endings
BBC children's television shows
1990s British children's television series
2000s British children's television series
English-language television shows
1990s British music television series
2000s British music television series